Hyman William Katz  (1898–1988) was an American artist (born in Poland) known for his printmaking for the Works Progress Administration (WPA).  

Katz's work is in the collection of the Metropolitan Museum of Art, the National Gallery of Art, the Philadelphia Museum of Art, and the Smithsonian American Art Museum.

Gallery

References

External links 

 

1898 births
1988 deaths
Polish artists
American artists
Federal Art Project artists